

Records 
 Producer with most awards: Carla Estrada with 8 awards.
 Producer with most nominations: Ernesto Alonso with 18 nominations.
 Producer with the most nominations (never winner): Angelli Nesma with 8 nominations.
 Producer who has won awards for two consecutive years: Ernesto Alonso, Carla Estrada, Rosy Ocampo and Giselle González.
 Producer win after long time: Juan Osorio by Mi segunda madre (1990) and Mi corazón es tuyo (2015), 25 years difference.
Youngest winner producers: Carla Estrada and Juan Osorio, 30 years old.
Oldest winner producer: Ernesto Alonso, 86 years old.
Youngest nominated producer: Carlos Sotomayor, 33 years old.
Oldest nominated producer: Ernesto Alonso, 87 years old.
Telenovela with most awards: Amar a muerte with 14 awards.
Telenovela with most nominations: Mi marido tiene más familia with 21 nominations.
Telenovela with the most nominations (without winning a single category): El color de la pasión and Sin rastro de ti with 13 nominations.
Producers and telenovelas winning with the same story: Ernesto Alonso (Bodas de odio, 1983) and Carla Estrada (Amor Real, 2003).

References

External links 
TVyNovelas at esmas.com
TVyNovelas Awards at the univision.com

Best Telenovela
Best Telenovela
Award for Best Telenovela
Award for Best Telenovela